Mathew W. Mendenhall (born May 14, 1957) is a former American football defensive end who played two seasons in the National Football League (NFL) for the Washington Redskins before numerous injuries and alcoholism ended his career. He started in Super Bowl XVII as his Redskins defeated the Miami Dolphins for the NFL Championship in 1982.

He played college football at BYU after attending East High School. He is the older brother of former Virginia Cavaliers football head coach Bronco Mendenhall.

References

1957 births
Living people
Washington Redskins players
BYU Cougars football players
American football defensive linemen